Alonso Coello may refer to:

 Alonso Coello Camarero, (born 1999) a Spanish professional footballer
 Alonso Sánchez Coello, (1531–1588) an Iberian portrait painter of the Spanish and Portuguese Renaissance